James Daniel Converse (born August 17, 1971) is an American former professional baseball pitcher. He played in Major League Baseball (MLB) from - for the Seattle Mariners and Kansas City Royals.

External links

1971 births
Living people
American expatriate baseball players in Canada
Baseball players from San Francisco
Bellingham Mariners players
Bowie Baysox players
Calgary Cannons players
Columbus Clippers players
Gulf Coast Yankees players
Huntsville Stars players
Jacksonville Suns players
Kansas City Royals players
Louisville RiverBats players
Major League Baseball pitchers
Oklahoma RedHawks players
Omaha Royals players
Rochester Red Wings players
Seattle Mariners players
Solano Steelheads players
Tacoma Rainiers players